Ras al-Ayn Qibli is a village in northern Syria, administratively part of the Aleppo Governorate, northeast of Aleppo and south of district center Ayn al-Arab. East of the Euphrates River, nearby localities include Sarrin to the west and al-Haqel to the southwest. According to the Syria Central Bureau of Statistics (CBS), Ras al-Ayn Qibli had a population of 2,581 in the 2004 census.

References

Populated places in Ayn al-Arab District